Volodymyr Vasyl'ovych Rybak (born 3 October 1946) is a Ukrainian politician. He was the Chairman of the Verkhovna Rada from 13 December 2012 to 22 February 2014. Volodymyr Rybak is also the original leader of the predecessor of the Party of Regions, the Party of Regional Revival of Ukraine. He is a Merited Builder of Ukraine (1995).

Biography
Born in the same city, Rybak graduated from the Department of Economy at the Donetsk State University in 1973, eventually receiving a doctor of economic sciences. He served as chairman of the city council, executive committee and mayor of Donetsk from 1993 to 2002. Rybak was co-organizer and first chairman of the Party of Regions between 1997 and 2001. In the 2002 parliamentary elections Rybak was elected into the Verkhovna Rada (Ukrainian parliament), he was reelected in the 2006, 2007 Ukrainian parliamentary election and 2012 parliamentary election. In 2012 he was placed tenth on the national party list of Party of Regions.

Rybak was Vice Premier of Ukraine and Construction, Architecture and Housing and Utility minister (August 4, 2006 till March 21, 2007) and Vice Premier of Ukraine (March 21, 2007 till December 18, 2007) in the Second Yanukovych Government.

On 13 December 2012 (following the 2012 Ukrainian parliamentary election) he was elected Chairman of the Verkhovna Rada. He resigned on 22 February 2014. Citing ill health and amidst the "2014 Ukrainian revolution".

Rybak did not participate in the 2014 Ukrainian parliamentary election, nor in the 2019 Ukrainian parliamentary election.

See also
 List of mayors of Donetsk

References

External links
 
 Rybak on Party of Region's official website

 

1946 births
Living people
Party of Regions politicians
Vice Prime Ministers of Ukraine
Chairmen of the Verkhovna Rada
Third convocation members of the Verkhovna Rada
Fourth convocation members of the Verkhovna Rada
Fifth convocation members of the Verkhovna Rada
Sixth convocation members of the Verkhovna Rada
Seventh convocation members of the Verkhovna Rada
Mayors of Donetsk
Pro-government people of the Euromaidan
Donetsk National University alumni
Ministers of Regional Development, Construction and Communal Living of Ukraine
Recipients of the Order of Prince Yaroslav the Wise, 4th class
Recipients of the Honorary Diploma of the Cabinet of Ministers of Ukraine